Julija "Julė" Pranaitytė (26 June 1881 – 29 January 1944) was a Russian Empire and later American newspaper editor, book publisher, and a woman traveler.

She was educated in Saint Petersburg (Russia), La Chapelle-Montligeon (France), and Ingenbohl (Switzerland). After the death of her fiancé poet Pranas Vaičaitis in 1901, she moved to United States where she collaborated with priest Antanas Milukas and edited the Catholic-minded magazine  until her death. Using her personal funds, she published about 35 Lithuanian books. Together with Milukas, she published about a hundred books. She translated religious texts from French and wrote travel books on her journey to Uzbekistan, Turkmenistan, Caucasus (published in 1914), Lithuania (1928), Spain (1932). She died in poverty and obscurity in 1944.

Early life and education
Pranaitytė was the 8th child in a family of well-off Lithuanian farmers in the  village near Griškabūdis, Suwałki Governorate, Congress Poland. After attending a local primary school, her elder brother priest Justinas Pranaitis took her with him to Saint Petersburg to attend the girls' gymnasium attached to the Catholic Church of St. Catherine. She sang at the church choir, directed by Lithuanian Česlovas Sasnauskas. In summer 1896, Pranaitytė met Pranas Vaičaitis at the home of her brother-in-law Saliamonas Banaitis. At the time, Vaičaitis was a law student at the Saint Petersburg University and they developed a close friendship that culminated in their engagement.

Upon graduation in 1896, Pranaitytė attended a school in La Chapelle-Montligeon that, upon graduation, granted the right to teach French in schools. In France, she started contributing to Lithuanian press – she wrote articles for Varpas, Tėvynės sargas, Vienybė Lietuvninkų. She also published nine issues of a religious bulletin translated from French. In 1901, during her summer vacation, she cared for her terminally ill fiancé Vaičaitis who had returned to his native  near Sintautai. Despite her efforts, Vaičaitis died of tuberculosis on 21 September 1901. It was a severe emotional loss for Pranaitytė and she remained unmarried.

In United States
Encouraged by her brother, Pranaitytė continued her French studies at Ingenbohl, Switzerland, where she met priest Antanas Milukas, studying canon law at the University of Fribourg. Their friendship and collaboration continued for the rest of their lives. Milukas, active in Lithuanian American press, invited Pranaitytė to move to United States. Towards the end of 1902, she arrived to Shenandoah, Pennsylvania, a coal mining town with a large Lithuanian population. There she was employed by Milukas as editor of the Catholic-minded magazine  (Star). She also edited various books published by Žvaigždė Press and personally financed about thirty books, including poetry collection of Pranas Vaičaitis (1903), biography of priest Motiejus Gustaitis, works of bishop Motiejus Valančius. In addition, she translated French religious books into Lithuanian often signing as Pranaičių Julė. She studied medicine at the University of Pennsylvania in 1909.

Pranaitytė visited Lithuania three times. In 1911, she visited the grave of Vaičaitis and persuaded his brother Jonas to name his newborn son Pranas in Vaičaitis' honor and memory. From there, she traveled to Tashkent where her brother Justinas Pranaitis worked as a missionary. She also visited Samarkand, Bukhara, Merv, Krasnovodsk, Baku, Tbilisi, traveled via the Georgian Military Road to Vladikavkaz. She published a 370-page book on the journey in 1914. She visited Lithuania again in 1923. A surviving photograph shows her and professor Eduards Volters, who supported Vaičaitis during his university studies, standing by the grave of Vaičaitis. She toured Lithuania, including the seaside, and again published her two-volume travel memoirs in 1928. Pranaitytė visited Spain and published a travel book in 1932. She returned to Lithuania again in 1932 to an official reception to honor Milukas' 40-year and her 30-year work for the Lithuanian press. The reception featured speeches by Adomas Dambrauskas-Jakštas, Juozas Tumas-Vaižgantas, Kazys Bizauskas, Jonas Vileišis, and others. She wrote and published Milukas' biography in 1931.

Pranaitytė continued to edit Žvaigždė and publish books, but it was not a profitable activity and she suffered severe financial hardship. In 1938, the Lithuanian government allotted her a special 250 litas monthly pension. However, it stopped after the occupation of Lithuania by the Soviet Union in June 1940. After Milukas' death in 1943, she inherited his archive, but it was lost after her death on 29 January 1944. She was buried in an unmarked grave in one of the cemeteries of Philadelphia.

References

1881 births
1944 deaths
Emigrants from the Russian Empire to the United States
People from Suwałki Governorate
Lithuanian publishers (people)
Women travel writers
American publishers (people)
Lithuanian travel writers